Charles Dubouillé was a male French international table tennis player.

He won a bronze medal at the 1936 World Table Tennis Championships in the Swaythling Cup (men's team event) with Raoul Bedoc, Michel Haguenauer, Paul Wolschoefer and Daniel Guérin for France.  Twelve years later he won a silver medal at the 1948 World Table Tennis Championships in the Swaythling Cup (men's team event).

He won two national singles titles.

See also
 List of table tennis players
 List of World Table Tennis Championships medalists

References

French male table tennis players
World Table Tennis Championships medalists
20th-century French people